Reaching Fourth is the second album by jazz pianist McCoy Tyner which was released on the Impulse! label in 1963. It features performances by Tyner with bassist Henry Grimes and drummer Roy Haynes.

Reception
The Allmusic review by Scott Yanow states that the album "although not as intense as his work with the John Coltrane Quartet, is generally memorable and still sounds quite viable 35 years later".

Track listing
 "Reaching Fourth" (Tyner) - 4:21
 "Goodbye" (Jenkins) - 5:46
 "Theme for Ernie" (Fred Lacey) - 6:00
 "Blues Back" (Tyner) - 6:54
 "Old Devil Moon" [From Finian's Rainbow] (Harburg, Lane) - 7:27
 "Have You Met Miss Jones?" [From I'd Rather Be Right] (Hart, Rodgers) - 3:47

Personnel
McCoy Tyner - piano
Henry Grimes - bass
Roy Haynes - drums

References

1963 albums
McCoy Tyner albums
Impulse! Records albums
Albums produced by Bob Thiele
Albums recorded at Van Gelder Studio